
Gmina Sierpc is a rural gmina (administrative district) in Sierpc County, Masovian Voivodeship, in east-central Poland. Its seat is the town of Sierpc, although the town is not part of the territory of the gmina.

Villages
Gmina Sierpc contains the villages and settlements of Białe Błoto, Białoskóry, Białyszewo, Białyszewo-Towarzystwo, Bledzewko, Bledzewo, Borkowo Kościelne, Borkowo Wielkie, Dąbrówki, Dębowo, Dziembakowo, Goleszyn, Gorzewo, Grodkowo-Włóki, Grodkowo-Zawisze, Karolewo, Kisielewo, Kręćkowo, Kwaśno, Mieszaki, Mieszczk, Miłobędzyn, Nowe Piastowo, Nowy Susk, Osówka, Pawłowo, Piaski, Podwierzbie, Rachocin, Rydzewo, Stare Piastowo, Studzieniec, Sudragi, Sułocin-Teodory, Sułocin-Towarzystwo, Susk, Szczepanki, Warzyn Kmiecy, Warzyn-Skóry, Wernerowo, Wilczogóra and Żochowo.

Neighbouring gminas
Gmina Sierpc is bordered by the town of Sierpc and by the gminas of Gozdowo, Mochowo, Rościszewo, Skępe, Szczutowo and Zawidz.

References
Polish official population figures 2006

Sierpc
Sierpc County